Jean-François Gravier was a French geographer famous for his work Paris and the French Desert published in 1947, and republished in 1953 and 1972. He denounces the extreme concentration of France in Paris, and the monopoly of that city over French resources.
Detailed information in English on J-F Gravier

Quotation

Bibliography 
 Gravier (J. - F.). Paris and the French desert, Portulan, Paris, 1947, 418 p.
 Gravier (J. - F.). Paris and the French desert in 1972, Flammarion, Paris, 1972, 284 p.

See also 
 Empty diagonal
 Regional planning
 Decentralization

French geographers